Élizabeth Clémentine Madeleine Bourgine (born 20 March 1957 in  Levallois-Perret, Hauts-de-Seine) is a French actress, appearing in film, television and theater. She is credited with more than 60 roles in film and television, mostly French productions.

Career

Originally a dancer and model, she studied at École des Beaux-Arts. She first appeared in student films between 1976 and 1977 until landing a role in the film Nestor Burma, with her future husband, Jean-Luc Miesch.She was awarded the Prix Romy Schneider Prize in 1985.

Since 2011 she has appeared in the joint French/British production Death in Paradise, a crime drama/comedy filmed in Guadeloupe for BBC One.

She is best known in France for her roles in A Heart in Winter (1992), My Best Friend (2006) and Private Lessons (1986).

Select filmography
 2006: My Best Friend : Julia
 2013: Joséphine, ange gardien : Jeanne (1 Episode)
 2011-present: Death in Paradise : Catherine Bordey (Season one: recurring, season two onwards: main.)
 2020: Maigret : Irène

Personal life

Bourgine was born 20 March 1957, in the Parisian suburb Levallois-Perret. She is married to Jean-Luc Miesch, and they have one adult son.

References

External links

1957 births
Living people
French television actresses
French film actresses
French stage actresses
People from Levallois-Perret
20th-century French actresses
21st-century French actresses